Cássio Vargas Barbosa also known as Cássio (born 25 November 1983 in Porto Alegre) is a Brazilian former football player who played as a striker.

External links
 
 Portuguese Liga Profile 
 
 
 
 
 
 

1983 births
Living people
Brazilian footballers
Brazilian expatriate footballers
Sport Club Corinthians Alagoano players
F.C. Maia players
C.D. Nacional players
U.D. Leiria players
G.D. Chaves players
S.C. Beira-Mar players
C.D. Aves players
Leixões S.C. players
FC Rapid București players
Gwangju FC players
AEL Limassol players
Fortaleza Esporte Clube
Associação Desportiva São Caetano players
Treze Futebol Clube players
Primeira Liga players
Liga Portugal 2 players
Liga I players
K League 2 players
Cypriot First Division players
Campeonato Brasileiro Série C players
Expatriate footballers in Portugal
Expatriate footballers in Romania
Expatriate footballers in Saudi Arabia
Expatriate footballers in South Korea
Brazilian expatriate sportspeople in Portugal
Brazilian expatriate sportspeople in Romania
Brazilian expatriate sportspeople in Saudi Arabia
Brazilian expatriate sportspeople in South Korea
Association football forwards
Ettifaq FC players
Saudi Professional League players
Footballers from Porto Alegre